Marrawah  is a small town in the north of the West Coast of Tasmania, Australia. Marrawah is located in the former shire of Wellington, now part of the Circular Head Council area.  At the 2006 census, Marrawah had a population of 407.

Marrawah is mainland Tasmania's westernmost settlement and the furthest settlement from Hobart. Marrawah also marked the end of Tasmania's westernmost railway, the Smithton to Marrawah Tramway. Farming, including dairy farming, and tourism are the main commercial activities. The area has several important Aboriginal sites, such as Aboriginal carvings at Mount Cameron West and Sundown Point.

Green Point Beach near Marrawah is also known as a good location for surfing, kitesurfing and windsurfing.

The Woolnorth Wind Farm on Cape Grim is visible in the distance to the north of Marrawah.

History
Marrawah Post Office opened on 1 March 1897. A Marrawah East office opened in 1921, was renamed Redpa in 1926 and closed in 1987.

Climate

References

Localities of Circular Head Council
Towns in Tasmania